Christianity is a minority religion in Chhattisgarh, a state of India. Chhattisgarh is within the area of the Church of North India. The Roman Catholic Archdiocese of Raipur has its seat in the province. The suffragan dioceses with seat in Chhattisgarh are the Syro-Malabar Catholic Diocese of Jagdalpur, the Roman Catholic Diocese of Ambikapur, the Roman Catholic Diocese of Jashpur and the Roman Catholic Diocese of Raigarh. Jyotipur has several Protestant churches. Chhattisgarh is part of the newly formed Syro-Malankara Catholic Diocese of Gurgaon. 
Janjgir Mennonite Church was founded in the early 20th century. 
 Dhamtari is the seat of the headquarters of the Mennonite Church in India and of Mennonite Higher Secondary Schools. Champa Christian Hospital was started by the Mennonite Mission USA in 1926. Believers Church of India is active in Chhattisgarh. Bilaspur has a Disciples of Christ Church. Jagdalpur has a Christ College. Many people in the state are Adivasi. Chhattisgarh has anti-conversion legislation.

List of denominations 

Source
Assemblies of God
Bharatiya General Conference Mennonite Church
Christian Community Church, Bhilai Nagar
Mennonite Church in India
Board of Christian Community Church
Church Of Christ Schaefer Mission In India Bilaspur
Indian Pentecostal Church of God

References

 
Religion in Chhattisgarh